The 1978 Brantford municipal election was held on November 13, 1978, to elect a mayor, councillors, and school trustees in Brantford, Ontario, Canada. Elections were also held in the rural and small-town communities surrounding the city.

Charles Bowen was narrowly re-elected to a fourth two-year term as mayor, defeating rival candidate Jo Brennan.

Results

Mike Woodburn was elected to city council in 1978 following a failed bid in 1976 and served for one term. He is the brother of Andy Woodburn, who served on council from 1976 to 1980 and again from 1982 to 1997.

Doug Reeves was elected to Brantford City Council for the city's fifth ward in 1976 and was re-elected without opposition in 1978. In January 1978, he spoke against a proposed anti-smoking by-law. Reeves later served as the Brant County area director for Legal Aid Ontario. He also chaired Brantford's downtown Business Improvement Area in the 1990s, and he welcomed the arrival of more police officers to the neighbourhood in 1999.

References

1978 elections in Canada
1978
1978 in Ontario